Coiled coil domain containing 90B, also known as CCDC90B, is a protein encoded by the CCDC90B gene.

Gene 

CCDC90B is located on chromosome 11 in humans. It is neighbored by:
 PCF11, a mammalian pre-mRNA cleavage complex 2 protein
 ANKRD42, ankyrin repeat protein involved with calcium ion bonding
 BC070093
 DLG2, a member of the membrane-associated guanylate kinase (MAGUK) family

Protein

Structure 
This protein is characterized by the presence of a domain of unknown function, DUF1640. This domain is a characteristic of the entire protein with the exception of the first twenty-three amino acid residues - MNSRQAWRLFLSQGRGDRWVSRP - which are a mitochondrial targeting site and cleaved.

The protein has seven predicted alpha helices, a characteristic of coiled-coil proteins.

Predicted Properties 

Molecular Weight: 26.72 kDa

Isoelectric point: 7.5

Transmembrane Helices: None

Post-translation modifications:
Chloroplast transit peptides:  None
Signal pepties:  None
C-mannosylation sites:  None
N-glycosylation sites:  None
Mitochondrial targeting: Yes 
Cleaved site:  MNSRQAWRLFLSQGRGDRWVSRP

Cellular Location 

CCDC90B is presumably a mitochondrial protein. It is predicted to contain at least three specific phosphorylation sites: Protein Kinase C Phosphorylation sites, Casein Kinase II Phosphorylation sites, and cAMP/cGMP Dependent Phosphorylation sites.

References

External links
 

Genes on human chromosome 11